Live on the Inside is a live DVD/CD set from country music duo Sugarland. It is their first live CD/DVD set and their fourth album overall. It was released on August 4, 2009, exclusively at Wal-Mart stores, and debuted at number one on both the U.S. Billboard 200 and Country Albums chart.

The day before the release of the CD/DVD, segments from the concert were featured in a one-hour ABC television special of the same name on August 3, 2009 at 8:00 PM. The special was watched by more than 4 million viewers.

History
The DVD was filmed during their October 25, 2008 concert at Rupp Arena in Lexington, Kentucky.  The CD features performances from various concerts, including Lexington, KY (tracks 1, 5, 7, 8, & 10), Alberta, Canada (track 2), Atlanta, Georgia (track 6), Austin, Texas (track 3), & Minneapolis, Minnesota (tracks 4 & 9).

In December 2008, the duo released a live music video for the song "Love". Footage from this video was taken from the same concert in Lexington.

On June 16, 2009, the set was officially announced on their official website. Filmed in high-definition by director Shaun Silva with twenty cameras, the DVD features 16 songs and over an hour of live performance footage including all of their #1 hits, as well as other songs from their previous albums.

The 10-track CD features cover songs performed by the duo including Beyoncé's "Irreplaceable", The B-52's "Love Shack", Edie Brickel's "Circle", R.E.M's "Nightswimming" & "The One I Love", Pearl Jam's "Better Man" and Kings of Leon's "Sex on Fire". The CD also features four Sugarland songs.

Critical reception
Thom Jurek of Allmusic gave the album three-and-a-half stars out of five, referring to it as "nearly the perfect document in that it contains not only the historic gig in all its technologically savvy glory, but also enough curios to interest even a casual fan." Chris Neal of Country Weekly magazine also rated it three-and-a-half stars out of five, making note of the "quirky covers" on the CD portion, but also criticizing the duo for not choosing a country music cover.

Track listing

Personnel

Sugarland
 Kristian Bush - acoustic guitar, mandolin, background vocals
 Jennifer Nettles - acoustic guitar, piano, lead vocals

Additional Musicians
 Thad Beaty - acoustic guitar, electric guitar
 Brandon Bush - accordion, keyboards, background vocals
 Annie Clements - bass guitar, background vocals
 Travis McNabb - drums
 Scott Patton - acoustic guitar, electric guitar, background vocals

Charts

Weekly charts

Year-end charts

References

Sugarland albums
Live video albums
2009 live albums
2009 video albums
Covers albums
Mercury Records live albums
Mercury Records video albums